Richard Curwen, D.D. was  an English Anglican priest in the 16th century.

Curwen was a Fellow of Corpus Christi College, Oxford. He held the living at  St Michael, Crooked Lane in the City of London and was a Canon of Lincoln Cathedral. He was appointed Archdeacon of Oxford in  1535. and Archdeacon of Colchester in 1537,  holding both positions until his death in 1543.

Notes

1543 deaths
16th-century English people
Archdeacons of Oxford
Fellows of Corpus Christi College, Oxford
Archdeacons of Colchester